Bjarne Ansbøl (born 3 July 1937) is a Danish wrestler. He competed in the men's Greco-Roman welterweight at the 1960 Summer Olympics.

References

External links
 

1937 births
Living people
Danish male sport wrestlers
Olympic wrestlers of Denmark
Wrestlers at the 1960 Summer Olympics
Sportspeople from Copenhagen
20th-century Danish people